Cytidine monophosphate, also known as 5'-cytidylic acid or simply cytidylate, and abbreviated CMP, is a nucleotide that is used as a monomer in RNA. It is an ester of phosphoric acid with the nucleoside cytidine. CMP consists of the phosphate group, the pentose sugar ribose, and the nucleobase cytosine; hence, a ribonucleoside monophosphate.
As a substituent it takes the form of the prefix cytidylyl-.

Metabolism
CMP can be phosphorylated to cytidine diphosphate by the enzyme CMP kinase, with adenosine triphosphate or guanosine triphosphate donating the phosphate group. Since cytidine triphosphate is generated by amination of uridine triphosphate, the main source of CMP is from RNA being decomposed by RNAse.

See also
 Deoxycytidine monophosphate
 Nucleoside
 Oligonucleotide

References

Nucleotides
Phosphate esters
Pyrimidones